The Defence Minister of the Republic of Latvia is the head of the Ministry of Defence, who is charged with the political leadership of the Latvian National Armed Forces. The position was re-established in November 1991 following the declaration on the restoration of the country's independence from the USSR.

Since 14 December 2022, the position has been held by Ināra Mūrniece.

From 1918 to 1922 the officeholder's title was Minister of Protection, and from 1922 to 1940 — Minister of War.

List of Ministers (since 1991)

See also
Ministry of Defence (Latvia)
Latvian National Armed Forces

Ministers of Defence of Latvia
Defence minister
Latvia